Stefano Pietribiasi (born 8 May 1985), with the nickname "Condoraccio", is an Italian footballer who plays as a striker for A.C Trento Calcio.

Career
Pietribiasi left for Pavia on 6 August 2007.

In January 2009, he was signed by Lega Pro 1st Div. side Sambenedettese in a co-ownership bid, along with Marco Zentil. Vicenza also got four players namely Mattia Evangelisti, Filippo Forò, Gianmarco Piccioni and German Pomiro. After the bankruptcy of Sambenedettese, Vicenza bought back Pietribiasi and Zentil. In August 2009 he was resold to Sambonifacese.

On 13 July 2011 Pietribiasi joined Carpi in 2-year contract. On 16 January 2012, Pietribiasi was loaned to Mantova F.C.

On 17 August 2012 he joined Mantova outright. on 6 August 2013 he was signed by Bassano. His contract was renewed on 23 May 2014. After losing playoff finals against Como, he signed a contract extension with Bassano until 2016.

In the summer of 2016 he moved to Pordenone.

In the summer of 2019 he moved to A.C Trento Calcio.

References

External links
 
 Football.it Profile 

Italian footballers
L.R. Vicenza players
A.C. Cuneo 1905 players
A.S.D. Calcio Ivrea players
F.C. Pavia players
F.C. Pro Vercelli 1892 players
A.S. Sambenedettese players
A.C. Carpi players
Association football forwards
People from Schio
1985 births
Living people
Sportspeople from the Province of Vicenza
Footballers from Veneto